Laura Victoria Lehmann-Pessumal (born July 16, 1994) is a Filipino actress, TV host, model and beauty pageant titleholder who was crowned Miss World Philippines 2017. She represented the Philippines at the Miss World 2017 pageant in China and finished as a Top 40 semifinalist.

Early life and education
Lehmann is of German, Swiss, Spanish, and Filipino descent, and was raised by a single mother.

Lehmann graduated from Assumption College San Lorenzo during her grade school days then during high school she transferred to Beacon International School before graduating at the International School Manila. She also attended Occidental College before transferring to Ateneo de Manila University to finish her studies.

She is a former member of the Philippines women's national softball team during her younger years and was supposed to play for Ateneo before she decided to accept the scholarship offered to her by the Occidental College at the last minute.

Career
Lehmann started off her career as a courtside reporter in the UAAP Season 77 and 78 for the Ateneo Blue Eagles. She then went on to be a courstide reporter in the Shakey's V-League in 2015. In 2016, she became one of the hosts of the shows Upfront at the UAAP in ABS-CBN Sports and Action and Listed in Lifestyle.

In 2018, Lehmann transferred and signed a management contract with GMA Network.

In 2020, Lehman became one of the host of The Game, the flagship sports newscast of One Sports.

Pageantry

Binibining Pilipinas 2014
On March 30, 2014, Lehmann joined the Binibining Pilipinas 2014 pageant wherein she was hailed as 1st Runner-Up.

Miss World Philippines 2017
On September 3, 2017, Lehmann joined and won the Miss World Philippines 2017 pageant succeeding Catriona Gray.

On October 7, 2018, Lehmann crowned Katarina Rodriguez as her successor at the Miss World Philippines 2018 pageant held at the Mall of Asia Arena in Pasay, Philippines.

Miss World 2017
Lehmann represented the Philippines at the Miss World 2017 pageant in Sanya, China where she placed in the Top 40 and won the Beauty With A Purpose award.

Personal life
Since 2014, Lehmann has been in a relationship with basketball player Von Pessumal. In May 2020, they announced their engagement after being together for five years. On May 23, 2021, she announced her marriage to Pessumal, which was solemnized in a civil ceremony earlier that year.

She took up Psychology at the Ateneo de Manila University.

Filmography

Film

References

External links 
 
 
 

1994 births
Ateneo de Manila University alumni
Binibining Pilipinas winners
Miss World Philippines winners
Miss World 2017 delegates
Filipino female models
Filipino people of German descent
Filipino people of Swiss descent
Filipino people of Spanish descent
Filipino softball players
Living people
People from Makati
Filipino film actresses